The Petrodvorets Watch Factory is one of the oldest factories in Russia. Founded by Peter the Great in 1721 as the Peterhof Lapidary Works, to make hardstone carvings, since 1945 the factory manufactures the Soviet Pobeda watches and since 1961 it has manufactured the Soviet Raketa watches. In almost 300 years of history, the factory has changed name several times. Petrodvorets is located in Saint Petersburg.

History
Founded in Saint Petersburg by Peter the Great in 1721 as the Peterhof Lapidary Works, to make hardstone carvings; the factory produced luxury objects in semi-precious and precious stones for the palaces of the Tsars. In the Soviet era, the plant continued to work on precious stones. 

During the Siege of Leningrad, the factory was destroyed by Nazi troops. It was rebuilt from 1944 at the liberation of the city. In 1945 Joseph Stalin—who wanted to reduce USSR's dependence on imports from the West—gave the order to the factory to manufacture watches. The first watches were produced in the factory under the brand Pobeda and Zvezda.

In its glory years after the war, the plant employed 8,000 people, produced 4.5 million watches per year for Soviet citizens and the needs of the Red Army. The plant was equipped with two atomic bunkers that could accommodate 8,000 people in case of a western nuclear attack.

After 1991 the plant dramatically cut production following the troubled years of privatization and the collapse of the Soviet Union.

Tourism
Today, the factory—that was considered as strategic, and closed to visitors during Soviet times—is opened to tourism. Peterhof has an average of three millions visitors per year, the factory has become a popular tour. Guides show around the production facility that gives a feeling of traveling back to the USSR, but also to learn about clock manufacturing.

Brands

From Soviet time
Raketa - luxury brand, fully manufactured in-house. The factory's high end production, Raketa was created in 1961 in honor of Yuri Gagarin's flight to space. One of the rare watch brands in the world producing its movements in-house from A to Z, Raketa is famous for its watches made for cosmonauts, polar expeditions, pilots and military.

Pobeda - affordable, loaded with history. Founded by Stalin himself in 1945, Pobeda is probably Russia's most popular brand for the last 100 years. First watch to have been in space in 1961, Pobeda has always been a popular and affordable Russian brand.

From Tsarist times
Talberg is a watch brand owned by the factory since before the Revolution. 

Imperial Lapidary Work of Peterhof. This is how the factory was named before 1917. As a brand it belongs to the Petrodvorets Watch Factory and from time to time you hear of a multi-million piece sold in auctions in London under that name.

Names used by the factory

 Since 1949, Petrodvorets Watсh Factory or - Petrodvorets Watch Factory "Raketa" or - Peterhof Watch Factory

References

 Sukhorukova A. E. / Watches: The Case of a Masters, Publisher: Det. USSR 1983. 108 pages;
 Tioutenkova A. G. / To Make the Time, Publisher: Lenizdat, USSR 1986, 181 pages.

Manufacturing companies based in Saint Petersburg
Companies established in 1721
Watch manufacturing companies of Russia
Hardstone carving
Watch manufacturing companies of the Soviet Union
Watch movement manufacturers
1721 establishments in Russia
Companies nationalised by the Soviet Union
Petergof
Ministry of Instrument Making (Soviet Union)